Ola Berger (born 15 March 1979) is a Norwegian ski mountaineer and cross-country skier.

Berger was born in Trondheim. He started ski mountaineering in 1997 and competed first in 2006. He studied at Norwegian University of Science and Technology. He is related to the orienteer and ski mountaineer Mari Fasting.

Between 2004 and 2011 Berger won the Vértex Vinter solo event six times and the duo event twice.

Selected results 
 2006:
 2nd, Oppdal race
 6th, Norwegian Championship
 2007:
 8th, European Championship relay race (together with Ola Herje Hovdenak, Martin Bartnes and Ove-Erik Tronvoll)
 2008:
 5th, Pierra Menta (together with Alexandre Pellicier)
 6th, World Championship combination ranking
 7th, World Championship relay race (together with Ove-Erik Tronvoll, Ola Herje Hovdenak and Ole-Jakob Sande)
 9th, World Championship vertical race
 9th, World Championship team race (together with Ola Herje Hovdenak)
 2009:
 7th, European Championship relay race (together with Ola Herje Hovdenak, Ove-Erik Tronvoll and Rolv Eriksrud)
 2010:
 7th, World Championship relay race (together with Ove-Erik Tronvoll, Ola Herje Hovdenak and Per Gustav Porsanger)
 2011:
 8th, World Championship relay, together with Ola Herje Hovdenak, Ove-Erik Tronvoll and Thomas Oyberg
 9th, World Championship vertical race
 2012:
 6th, European Championship relay, together with Ola Herje Hovdenak, Ove-Erik Tronvoll and Olav Tronvoll

Cross-country skiing results
All results are sourced from the International Ski Federation (FIS).

World Cup

Season standings

References

External links 
 Ola Berger at Skimountaineering.org
 

1979 births
Living people
Norwegian male ski mountaineers
Norwegian male cross-country skiers
Sportspeople from Trondheim
Norwegian University of Science and Technology alumni